TheatreSquared, founded in 2005, is a regional professional theatre located in downtown Fayetteville, Arkansas. The company stages seven productions each year as well as the Arkansas New Play Festival of emerging works, totaling 270 annual performances for an audience of approximately 60,000 including 20,000 students and their teachers. The company is one of only two companies in the state of Arkansas presenting a year-round season and affiliated with the national professional actors' union, Actors' Equity Association.

TheatreSquared is co-led by artistic director Robert Ford and executive director Martin Miller. In addition to its season of theatrical works, the company's educational outreach program offers an educational school tour to more than 80 high schools, the Word/Play in-school literacy intervention program, a professional development institute for educators, and student matinees and discussions.

In 2011, TheatreSquared was awarded a National Theatre Company Grant from the American Theatre Wing, recognizing the company as one of the nation's ten most promising emerging professional theatres. They were also featured in the American Theatre Wing's Working in the Theatre series on Theatre in Arkansas in 2016.

History
TheatreSquared was founded in 2005 and staged its initial production, Teresa Rebeck's Bad Dates, in 2006. Robert Ford, a playwright and company co-founder, became artistic director in 2007. Martin Miller, a former associate producer at Chicago Shakespeare Theater, joined as executive director in 2009.

In the past decade, the theatre's annual budget has grown from $160,000 to $6 million, making it one of the larger cultural institutions serving audiences in Arkansas. In 2016, the theatre launched a new access program called "Lights Up!" with support from the Walmart Foundation, extending free tickets to low-income community members, $10 tickets for youth, and $1 tickets to recipients of SNAP benefits at performances year-round.

The company has placed a strong focus on new work development and premieres, collaborating on new scripts with playwrights including Qui Nguyen, Lisa D'Amour, Lee Blessing, Mary Kathryn Nagle, Bryna Turner, Barbara Hammond, E.M. Lewis, Mona Mansour, Amy Evans, and many others.

Critical Reception and Awards
TheatreSquared was a 2011 recipient of the National Theatre Company Grant from the American Theatre Wing, founder of the Tony Awards, in its first year of eligibility. The company is a ten-time grantee of the National Endowment for the Arts. As of October 2019, the company was the top-rated attraction in Fayetteville, Arkansas, on the travel review website TripAdvisor.com.

Facility
As part of a $34 million capital campaign, the company completed a 50,000 square-foot facility in mid-2019 that includes two venues, offices, artists' apartments, production workspaces, and the open-all-day Commons Bar-Café. The building is a design collaboration between theatre planners Charcoalblue and New York-based Marvel Architects. Performances were previously held in the 175-seat Studio Theatre at Nadine Baum Studios, through a rental arrangement with the touring arts presenter Walton Arts Center.

The new facility was a 2020 recipient of the American Architecture Award, AIA New York State Honor Award, and Interior Design Best of Year Award.

References

External links

TheatreSquared website
TheatreSquared new facility website

Theatres in Arkansas
Theatre companies in Arkansas
Buildings and structures in Fayetteville, Arkansas
Tourist attractions in Fayetteville, Arkansas